The 1977 WHA Amateur Draft was the fifth and final draft held by the World Hockey Association.


Selections by Round
Below are listed the selections in the 1977 WHA Amateur Draft.

Round 1

Round 2

Round 3

Round 4

Round 5

Round 6

Round 7

Round 8

Round 9

Round 10

See also
1977 NHL Amateur Draft
1977–78 WHA season

References
1977 WHA Amateur Draft on Hockeydb.com

WHA Amateur Drafts
Draft